Charles Edward Patterson (May 3, 1842 – February 22, 1913) was an American lawyer and politician.

Life
Charles E. Patterson was born in Corinth, Vermont on May 3, 1842, the son of Dr. James Hervey Patterson. He was educated at Castleton Seminary in Castleton, Vermont and Cambridge Academy in Cambridge, New York, and graduated from Union College in 1860. He studied law, was admitted to the bar, and practiced in Troy, New York where he became a partner in the firm of David L. Seymour whose daughter he married.

He was a member of the New York State Assembly (Rensselaer Co., 1st D.) in 1881 and 1882; and was elected  Speaker on February 2, 1882, after a month-long struggle of the different factions of the Democratic Party. The rural Democrats and the County Democracy had tried to oppose John Kelly and Tammany Hall, but eventually came to terms.

Charles E. Patterson died in Augusta, Georgia on February 22, 1913.

References

Speaker election and short bio, in NYT on February 3, 1882
Courts_and_lawyers_pgs1060-1073 at www.courts.state.ny.us Rensselaer County lawyers at Court History

1842 births
1913 deaths
Union College (New York) alumni
Members of the New York State Assembly
Speakers of the New York State Assembly
People from Corinth, Vermont
Politicians from Troy, New York
19th-century American politicians